Oxidative decarboxylation is a decarboxylation reaction caused by oxidation. Most are accompanied by α- Ketoglutarate α- Decarboxylation caused by dehydrogenation of hydroxyl carboxylic acids such as carbonyl carboxylic acid, malic acid, isocitric acid, etc.

Differences between oxidative decarboxylation and simple decarboxylation 
Pyruvate catalytic reaction catalyzed by pyruvate dehydrogenase system is a special decarboxylation method, namely oxidative decarboxylation, which is different from the common decarboxylation reaction, namely common decarboxylation.

The oxidative decarboxylation reaction is catalyzed by pyruvate dehydrogenase system, which includes three different enzymes: pyruvate dehydrogenase (E1), dihydrolipoamide acetyltransferase (E2), dihydrolipoamide dehydrogenase (E3), and six cofactors: thiamine pyrophosphate (TPP), lipoamide, coenzyme A (CoA), flavin adenine dinucleotide (FAD), nicotinamide adenine dinucleotide (NAD+), and magnesium ion.

During the reaction, E1 participates in the decarboxylation of pyruvic acid, and then TPP connects the acetyl group after the reaction. The carbonyl group of the acetyl group reacts with the carbonyl group of the carbon negative ion on the thiazole ring of TPP to form hydroxyethyl. Then, with the catalysis of E2, TPP sends the hydroxyethyl to lipoamide, which is reoxidized to acetyl to produce thioester bond. At this time, the compound is acetyl dihydrolipoamide, which is then catalyzed by E2, and acetyl is transferred, to form acetyl CoA, all the above reactions only involve decarboxylation reaction, and do not involve the movement of H, while the real dehydrogenation effect of pyruvate dehydrogenase system will be reflected in the next step of reaction. Acetyl dihydrolipoamide without acetyl group is lost, that is, dihydrolipoamide needs to be re oxidized to lipoamide to participate in the reaction again. At this time, E3 needs to participate in the catalytic reaction, and the hydrogen removed from dihydrolipoamide will be transferred to FAD to make it FADH2, FADH2 reacts with NAD+to generate NADH and H+.

To sum up, in oxidative dehydrogenation reaction, there are both oxidation reaction and dehydrogenation effect.

For simple decarboxylation reaction, the enzyme involved in this reaction is pyruvate decarboxylase, which is different from oxidative decarboxylation. During the reaction, pyruvate is directly connected with the thiazole ring of TPP, and the carboxyl group on pyruvate is removed after the connection to generate carbon dioxide. Then hydroxyethyl was separated from TPP to produce acetaldehyde.

Bridging glycolysis and the citric acid cycle 

Pyruvate, the product of glycolysis under aerobic conditions, is a metabolic branch point. As a preliminary to following the central path of aerobic metabolism from glycolysis to the citric acid cycle, we put pyruvate in perspective by considering its various possible fates. We also consider the broader context of common carboxylation and decarboxylation reactions in biochemistry.

The most important fate of pyruvate at least for our present purposes is its oxidative decarboxylation to acetyl CoA, this reaction is catalyzed by a very large assembly of enzyme subunits called the pyruvate dehydrogenase complex (PDH complex, or often simply "PDH"). This large supramolecular assembly contains multiple copies of three different types of subunits. These subunits catalyze different steps of the overall reaction. Central to the operation of the PDH complex is a key catalytic cofactor, thiamine pyrophosphate (TPP). We will examine closely the chemistry of this extraordinary and important cofactor.

Carboxylation and decarboxylation reactions 
Let us define a carboxylation reaction as the addition of a CO2 unit to a substrate molecule, and decarboxylation as loss of CO2. Decarboxylation reaction reactions are typically quite thermodynamically favorable due to the entropic contribution of cleaving a single molecule into two, one of which is a gas. Conversely, we can expect carboxylation reactions to be energy-requiring, and we should not be surprised to learn ATP hydrolysis is coupled to carboxylation. The most prominent carboxylation reactions in biochemistry are catalyzed by biotin-dependent carboxylases and RuBisCO.

The biochemistry of thiamine 
Decarboxylation in metabolism can be either non-oxidative or oxidative. In contrast to the relatively facile decarboxylation of β-keto acids, the decarboxylation of α-keto acids presents a mechanistic challenge. Thiamine pyrophosphate (TPP) provides the biochemical and enzymological answer.

TPP is the key catalytic cofactor used by enzymes catalyzing non-oxidative and oxidative decarboxylation of α-keto acids. Pyruvate, for example, undergoes both types of decarboxylation, both involving TPP. In fermentative organisms, pyruvate is non-oxidatively decarboxylated by the TPP-dependent enzyme pyruvate decarboxylase. As part of the PDH complex, TPP assists in oxidative decarboxylation of pyruvate. TPP is a true catalytic cofactor. In a mechanistic feature common to all its reactions, TPP is a carrier of activated aldehyde moieties. A hydrogen attached to the C2 carbon of the thiazole ring of TPP shows an unusually low pKa. Thiamine deficiency underlies the disorder beriberi.

The pyruvate dehydrogenase complex (PDH) 
Oxidative metabolism entails the further catabolism of pyruvate. The pyruvate dehydrogenase, or PDH complex carries out the oxidative decarboxylation process that generates acetyl CoA from pyruvate. The PDH complex serves as the link between glycolysis and the citric acid cycle and is required for oxidative metabolism. The activity of PDH involves three distinct enzymes, four activities, and five different cofactors.

Steps of the PDH complex:

(1) decarboxylation (E1, formation of hydroxyethyl-TPP)

(2) oxidation (transfer of acetyl group to lipoamide)

(3) transfer of acetyl group from acetyl-lipoamide to CoA)

(4) oxidation of dihydrolipoamide to lipoamide (E3, FAD, NAD+)

Acetyl CoA, which is fed into the citric acid cycle This conversion, an oxidative decarboxylation of pyruvate yielding a thioester product, is carried out by a complex and fascinating multienzyme complex known as the pyruvate dehydrogenase complex (also sometimes abbreviated as PDC).

Multiple copies of three different enzymes compose a supramolecular structure that coordinates a four-step process converting the α-keto acid pyruvate to the thioester (with coenzyme A) of acetate, as well as electron transfer (redox) reactions that yield NADH. Five cofactors participate in the reactions of the complex. E1 is pyruvate dehydrogenase, which uses thiamine pyrophosphate (TPP) as a cofactor to decarboxylate pyruvate and transfer the remaining hydroxyethyl fragment to the lipoamide cofactor attached to E2. This results in the formation of acetyl lipoamide, equivalent to reduction of lipoamide (and oxidation of the hydroxyethyl fragment), as becomes clear upon subsequent transfer of the acetyl residue to coenzyme A, catalyzed by E2, an acetyltransferase and E3, which regenerates lipoamide from dihydrolipoamide, is dihydrolipoyl dehydrogenase.

Starting at the left-hand side, the thiazolium form of the TPP cofactor, which is a carbanion resulting from loss of H+ from the unusually acidic C2 of the thiazole ring, attacks the carbonyl carbon of pyruvate, forming the addition compound shown at the top of the figure. This addition compound can readily undergo decarboxylation (loss of carbon dioxide), with the product hydroxyethyl TPP stabilized by resonance. The next step is the transfer of the hydroxyethyl moiety from TPP to the oxidized form of the lipoamide cofactor. The hydroxyethyl group is electron-rich, and in its reaction with lipoamide it is in effect oxidized to the carboxyl level of oxidation, while lipoamide is reduced. This reaction can be dissected into two steps, where in the first step the electron-rich carbon atom of the hydroxyethyl group attached to TPP attacks - as a strong nucleophile - one of the relatively electron-deficient sulfur atoms of the intramolecular disulfide of oxidized lipoamide. This results in the intermediate shown at lower left in the figure, which has the form of a hemi thioketal. In the next step, as TPP departs as a leaving group, taking electrons from the bond to the hydroxyethyl group with it, the hydroxyethyl recruits the electrons from the O-H bond, assisted by a conveniently located enzyme-derived base to accept the resulting hydrogen ion. The result of these two steps is the production of the thioester acetyl lipoamide and regeneration of the TPP cofactor. All these reactions are catalyzed by the E1, or pyruvate dehydrogenase, component of the PDH complex.

The rest of the chemistry of the PDH complex is shown at the bottom of the figure. The acetyl group is transferred from reduced lipoamide to coenzyme A (CoA) by the activity of the E2, or dihydrolipoyl transacetylase, component of the complex. This is an isoenergetic conversion of one thioester to another. The free dihydrolipoamide (reduced form of lipoamide) must be re-oxidized, and this is accomplished by the activity of E3, or dihydrolipoyl dehydrogenase, component of PDH complex. Note that the cofactor of E3 is a tightly bound flavin adenine dinucleotide (FAD) molecule. The electrons from dihydrolipoamide are transferred, via FAD, to NAD+, forming NADH. This is noteworthy since in the usual order of reduction potentials, the reduction of FAD by NADH would be the energetically favorable process. Apparently, specific protein environments can perturb reduction potentials of redox groups, just as they are able to perturb pKa's of ionizable groups.

A very similar series of reactions is carried out as part of the citric acid cycle by the α-ketoglutarate dehydrogenase multienzyme complex, which is also closely related to the PDH complex in composition and structure, using the same E3 component, and an E1 that acts on α-ketoglutarate as a substrate in place of pyruvate. In this case, E2 is a succinyl transferase, and succinyl CoA is the product thioester.

References 

Substitution reactions